Sulayman ibn al-Hasan ibn Makhlad was an official of the Abbasid Caliphate. The son of the former vizier al-Hasan ibn Makhlad al-Jarrah, Sulayman rose to occupy the office of vizier three times, in 930–931, 936, and lastly in 940–941, under the amir al-umara Bajkam. According to the modern historian of the Abbasid vizierate, Dominique Sourdel, he was "remarkable mainly for his ineptitude".

Sources
 

9th-century births
10th-century deaths
Viziers of the Abbasid Caliphate

10th-century Arabs